Edingerella is an extinct genus of temnospondyl amphibian from the Early Triassic of Madagascar. It is a basal capitosaur closely related to Watsonisuchus.

Phylogeny
Below is a cladogram from Fortuny et al. (2011):

References

Triassic temnospondyls of Africa
Prehistoric animals of Madagascar
Capitosaurs
Early Triassic amphibians of Africa
Prehistoric amphibian genera